Verkhneye Labkomakhi (Dargwa: ЧебяхӀ Лябхъумахьи) is a rural locality (a selo) and the administrative centre of Verkhne-Labkomakhinsky Selsoviet, Levashinsky District, Republic of Dagestan, Russia. The population was 741 as of 2010. There are 22 streets.

Geography 
Verkhneye Labkomakhi is located 19 km southeast of Levashi (the district's administrative centre) by road, on the Khalagork River. Sangimakhi and Nizhneye Labkomakhi are the nearest rural localities.

Nationalities 
Dargins live there.

References 

Rural localities in Levashinsky District